Nand Katyal (born January 30, 1935 in Lahore), is an Indian artist. His family came to Delhi from Lahore after Partition, and settled there when he was around twelve years of age. His father, Ram Lal Katyal, was himself a painter. Hence Nand was exposed to art materials and the art circle of Lahore at an early age. He studied Fine Art at the Polytechnic in Delhi and worked as an art teacher. In the early 1960s, Katyal joined the American Center and served as the Art Director of Span magazine for many years before turning to art as a freelance practitioner.

He served as the Secretary, Delhi Silpi Chakra for the period 1963-1967 and was the Director, 10th Triennale India in 2001. He was part of the five member jury for National Awards of Lalit Kala Akademi in 2004. Nand Katyal was awarded with the National Award in 1995, and was given a Felicitation, 10th Rashtriya Kala Mela, in 1997. 

His one-man shows have been held in various galleries including Shridharani in Delhi and Cymroza in Mumbai, and he has also participated in various group shows, including some international workshops and camps. His work has been exhibited in important national exhibitions as well as the Triennale and other international shows. His works can be seen in the collections of the National Gallery of Modern Art in Delhi, Bharat Bhavan, Bhopal and with other institutions and individuals in the country.

Nand Katyal lives in Delhi and works from his studio at Garhi.

References

External links
 https://www.mojarto.com/artists/nand-katyal
 
 http://demythic.com/Katyal.htm
 https://web.archive.org/web/20140501164536/http://www.artheritagegallery.com/artists_profile.php?arti=MTY1
 http://www.artintaglio.in/ArtistGallery.jsp?ArtistId=290
 http://www.saatchionline.com/profile/183825

1935 births
Living people
Artists from Lahore